Práznovce is a municipality in the Topoľčany District of the Nitra Region, Slovakia. In 2011 it had 962 inhabitants.

References

External links
 http://en.e-obce.sk/obec/praznovce/praznovce.html
 Official homepage

Villages and municipalities in Topoľčany District